The archbishop of Luxembourg is the ordinary of the Roman Catholic archbishopric of Luxembourg. The position was created on 23 April 1988, when Luxembourg was promoted from a bishopric. The seat of the see is Notre-Dame Cathedral, in Luxembourg City.

List of ordinaries

Bishops of Luxembourg

Archbishops of Luxembourg

See also
 Roman Catholic Archdiocese of Luxembourg

Archbishops of Luxembourg
Luxembourg
Archbishops of Luxembourg
Luxembourg